Asar Talo Lahat Panalo!  is a 2010 Philippine television game show broadcast by GMA Network. Hosted by Edu Manzano, it premiered on September 18, 2010. The show concluded on November 20, 2010 with a total of 55 episodes.

Hosts
 Edu Manzano
 Nina Kodaka
 Ellen Adarna

Format
Asar Talo Lahat Panalo" is an original and one-of-a-kind program guaranteed to deliver laughs and surprises. Aired Mondays to Saturdays, the show is GMA-7's treat to all contestants who will be up to the challenge of facing the most menacing attacks, the most aggressive of audiences, and the most challenging remarks live.

A game show, it promises the contestants the chance to bring home big cash prizes if the contestant called the Bida survives the barrage of heckling from the Kontrabidas known as the Sulsuleros. A celebrity guest will act as the head heckler who will be called Kapitan Kontra.

Mechanics
 There are 7 categories, one question each.
 Two wrong answers, the contestant loses!
 For the first wrong answer, there is a "repeater" question that needs to be answered.
 The contestant may ask for a "Salba-bida" or clue! This can only be used once.

Ratings
According to AGB Nielsen Philippines' Mega Manila People/Individual television ratings, the pilot episode of Asar Talo Lahat Panalo! earned a 6.4% rating. While the final episode scored a 3.8% rating.

Accolades

References

2010 Philippine television series debuts
2010 Philippine television series endings
Filipino-language television shows
GMA Network original programming
Philippine game shows